Kargalık may refer to:
 Kargalık, Korkuteli, a village in Antalya Province, Turkey
 , a village in Sarıkaya district, Yozgat Province, Turkey
 Kargalık, historic name of two villages, now merged into Corbu, Constanța, Romania

See also 
 Kargali (disambiguation)
 Kargilik (disambiguation)